This is a list of Cornish people who were notable soldiers, seamen or airmen.

Army and Air Force officers and other ranks
 Major Arthur Agar-Robartes, British Army officer and cricketer
 Captain Thomas Agar-Robartes, British Army officer and MP
 Harold "Harry" Billinge (died 2022), sapper, D-Day veteran
 Colonel James Carne VC DSO, British Army officer
 John Gilbert "Jack" Cock DCM MM, soldier and footballer
 Horace Augustus Curtis VC, British soldier
 Robert Davies, Lieutenant of the Royal Engineers awarded the G.C. for bomb-disposal in 1940 saving St. Paul's Cathedral.
 John Enys, British soldier during the American Revolution.
 James Fynn VC, British soldier
 Lieutenant Colonel Sidney Godolphin, soldier and Member of Parliament 
 Captain Albert Jacka VC, MC and Bar, the first Australian to win the VC at Gallipoli (his family migrated to Victoria from St Buryan)
Lieutenant-Colonel Sir Arthur Olver, British army officer and expert on animal husbandry
 Rick Rescorla, U.S. war hero and 9/11 victim (1939–2001)
 Sergeant Steven Roberts, the first soldier to die in the invasion of Iraq
 Captain George Symons VC, DCM, artillery officer
 Sir John Trelawny, 1st Baronet, soldier in the English Civil War
 Captain Arthur Tremayne, soldier in the Crimean War; MP for Truro
 Captain Robert Walling, Royal Garrison Artillery

Airmen
 Wing Commander Guy Gibson of The Dambusters.
 Charles Reep, airman and inventor of the long ball in soccer
 Nigel Tangye, airman, author and hotelier at Newquay
 Geoffrey Wellum, DFC, fighter pilot and author

Commanders
 Sir John Arundell, Cornish Royalist commander
 Colonel Edward Bolitho, British Army officer 
 Major-General Charles Edward-Collins, British Indian Army officer.
 Major-General Sir Wyndham Childs, British Army officer and Assistant Commissioner of Police of the Metropolis 
 Sir Walter Gilbert, 1st Baronet, general
 Bevil Grenville, Cornish Royalist commander
 Sir Richard Grenville, 1st Baronet (or Granville) (1600–1658), Cornish Royalist leader during the English Civil War
 Major General Sir Gerald Kitson, British Army officer 
 Philip Melvill, Governor of Pendennis Castle, Falmouth
 William Scawen, Royalist commander in the English Civil War
 Major-General Sir William Penn Symons KCB, British Army officer 
 Richard Trant (d. 2007), general in the British army
 John Trevanion, Cornish Royalist commander
 John Johns Trigg, officer in the Virginia militia, American Civil War
 Stephen Trigg, brother of John, politician and officer in the Virginia militia, American Civil War
 David Tyacke, GOC Singapore District, last Commanding Officer of the DCLI
 James Howard Williams (Elephant Bill), lieutenant-colonel in the British Indian Army and elephant expert
 Sir Charles Wills, British Army general and politician

Airmen
Air Chief Marshal Sir Alec Coryton, Royal Air Force officer
 Air Commodore John Grigson DSO, DFC, Royal Air Force

Seamen
 John Eliot, captain in the Royal Navy and Governor of West Florida 
 James Erisey, privateer
 Captain William Hennah, RN
 Robert Peverell Hichens, DSO, DSC, lieutenant commander, RNVR
 William Hicks, Lieut. RN
 Sir Edward Nicholl, commander, RNR
 William Odgers, VC, sailor in New Zealand
 Ernest Herbert Pitcher, VC, petty officer in the Royal Navy
 Spry family, of St Anthony in Roseland: several members of the family were commanders in the Royal Navy
 John St Aubyn, 4th Baron St Levan, hereditary peer and decorated Royal Navy officer
 Walter Tremenheere KH (1761-1855), colonel of marines 
 James Trevenen, captain in the Russian Navy
 Joseph Trewavas, VC, seaman in the Royal Navy
 Mark Versallion, lieutenant, RNR
 Samuel Wallis, commander in the Royal Navy and explorer of the Pacific
 Charles Bampfield Yule, lieutenant, RN

Admirals
Sir John Arundell of Lanherne alias John Fitzalan, 1st Baron Arundel (died 1379), naval commander and Lord Marshal of England
Sir John Arundell, admiral, known as 'Jack of Tilbury'
 Edward Boscawen, Royal Navy admiral
 Sir Frederick Edward-Collins, Admiral RN; Acting Governor and Commander in Chief of the Fortress of Gibraltar
 Sir Frank Hopkins, Royal Navy Admiral, a former captain of the aircraft carrier 
 Rear-Admiral Bartholomew James (1752 – 1828), naval officer and writer
Edward Pellew, 1st Viscount Exmouth, Royal Navy admiral
Admiral Barrington Reynolds, RN, notable for an anti-slavery expedition
 Rear-Admiral Robert Carthew Reynolds, RN
Sir Bartholomew Sulivan, Royal Navy admiral and hydrographer
Rear-Admiral Thomas Ball Sulivan, Royal Navy officer
Richard Darton Thomas, Royal Navy admiral
Sir John Forster "Sandy" Woodward,  Royal Navy admiral

See also

 Duke of Cornwall's Light Infantry officers
 Duke of Cornwall's Light Infantry soldiers

References

Soldiers, Commanders and Sailors
Military history of Great Britain
Military history of Cornwall
Lists of British military personnel
 List military

Lists of soldiers